= Cossaea =

Greek town

Cossaea or Kossaia (Ancient Greek: Κοσσαία) was a Greek town in ancient Thrace. It was a member of the Delian League, appearing in Athenian tribute lists of 425/4 BCE.

Its site has not been located.
